Ved Pratap Vaidik (30 December 1944 – 14 March 2023) was an Indian journalist, political analyst, and freelance columnist. He worked with the Press Trust of India, and was the founder and editor of its Hindi news agency "Bhasha". Before that he was the editor for views for the Navbharat Times of the Times Group. Later he was the chairman of Bhartiya Bhasha Sammelan. He was born in Indore on 30 December 1944, and died in Gurugram, Haryana on 14 March 2023, at age 78.

Published work
Vaidik published several award-winning research publications. His published books include:

Soviet-American Rivalry in Afghanistan 
Hindi Journalism : Various Dimensions 
Indian Foreign Policy : New Pointers 
Bhartiya Bhashayen Lao : Kyon Aur Kaise? 
Hindi ka Sampurna Samachar Patra Kaisa ho? 
Vartmaan Bharat 
Afghanistan : Kal, Aaj aur Kal 
Mahshakti Bharat 
Ethnic Crisis in Sri Lanka : India's Options 

In English:
 Meri Jati Hindustani (Diamond Books)
 swabhasha Lao: Angreji Hatwo (Prabhat Prakashan)
 Hindi Kaisa Bane vishwabhasha (Vani Prakashan)
 Modi ki Videshniti (Diamond Books)

Awards
Some of the awards received by Vaidik are:
 
Govind Vallabh Pant award 1976
Purushottam Das Tandon award 1988
Hindi Academy Delhi award for Journalism 1990
Ram Manohar Lohia award Kanpur 1990
Ramdhari Singh Dinkar award 1992
Lala Lajpat Rai award 1992
 Vishwa Hindi Sammalan Samman, Surinam 2003
 Newsmakers Achievers Awards 2022

References

Sources
 Agrawal Giriraj Sharan & Agrawal Meena HINDI SAHITYAKAR SANDARBH KOSH  Volume II 2006 Hindi Sahitya Niketan Bijnor (U.P.) India,

External links
  Writer's study, neighbour's PRIDE

1944 births
2023 deaths
20th-century Indian journalists
Journalists from Madhya Pradesh
Writers from Indore